Hexachlorophosphazene is an inorganic compound with the formula . The molecule has a cyclic, unsaturated backbone consisting of alternating phosphorus and nitrogen centers, and can be viewed as a trimer of the hypothetical compound . Its classification as a phosphazene highlights its relationship to benzene. There is large academic interest in the compound relating to the phosphorus-nitrogen bonding and phosphorus reactivity.

Occasionally, commercial or suggested practical applications have been reported, too, utilising hexachlorophosphazene as a precursor chemical. Derivatives of noted interest include the hexalkoxyphosphazene lubricants obtained from nucleophilic substitution of hexachlorophosphazene with alkoxides, or chemically resistant inorganic polymers with desirable thermal and mechanical properties known as polyphosphazenes produced from the polymerisation of hexachlorophosphazene.

Structure and characterisation

Bond lengths and conformation 
Hexachlorophosphazene has a  core with six equivalent P–N bonds, for which the adjacent P–N distances are 157 pm. This is characteristically shorter than the ca. 177 pm P–N bonds in the valence saturated phosphazane analogues.

The molecule possesses D3h symmetry, and each phosphorus center is tetrahedral with a Cl–P–Cl angle of 101°.

The  ring in hexachlorophosphazene deviates from planarity and is slightly ruffled (see chair conformation). By contrast, the  ring in the related hexafluorophosphazene species is completely planar.

Characterisation methods 
31P-NMR spectroscopy is the usual method for assaying hexachlorophosphazine and its reactions. Hexachlorophosphazine exhibits a single resonance at 20.6 ppm as all P environments are chemically equivalent.

In it IR spectrum, the 1370 and 1218 cm−1 vibrational bands are assigned to νP–N stretches. Other bands are found at 860 and 500–600 cm−1, respectively assigned to ring and νP–Cl.

Hexachlorophosphazine and many of its derivatives have been characterized by single crystal X-ray crystallography.

Bonding

Early analyses
Cyclophosphazenes such as hexachlorophosphazene are distinguished by notable stability and equal P–N bond lengths which, in many such cyclic molecules, would imply delocalization or even aromaticity. To account for these features, early bonding models starting from the mid-1950s invoked a delocalised π system arising from the overlap of N 2p and P 3d orbitals.

Modern bonding models
Starting from the late 1980s, more modern calculations and the lack of spectroscopic evidence reveal that the P 3d contribution is negligible, invalidating the earlier hypothesis. Instead, a charge separated model is generally accepted.

According to this description, the P–N bond is viewed as a very polarised one (between notional  and ), with sufficient ionic character to account for most of the bond strength.

The rest (~15%) of the bond strength may be attributed to a negative hyperconjugation interaction: the N lone pairs can donate some electron density into π-accepting σ* molecular orbitals on the P.

Synthesis
The synthesis of hexachlorophosphazene was first reported by von Liebig in 1834. In that report he describes experiments conducted with Wöhler. They found that phosphorus pentachloride and ammonia react exothermically to yield a new substance that could be washed with cold water to remove the ammonium chloride coproduct. The new compound contained P, N, and Cl, on the basis of elemental analysis. It was sensitive toward hydrolysis by hot water.

Modern syntheses are based on the developments by Schenk and Römer who used ammonium chloride in place of ammonia and inert chlorinated solvents. By replacing ammonia with ammonium chloride allows the reaction to proceed without a strong exotherm associated with the / reaction. Typical chlorocarbon solvents are 1,1,2,2-tetrachloroethane or chlorobenzene, which tolerate the hydrogen chloride side product. Since ammonium chloride is insoluble in chlorinated solvents, workup is facilitated. For the reaction under such conditions, the following stoichiometry applies:

where n can usually take values of 2 (the dimer tetrachlorodiphosphazene), 3 (the trimer hexachlorotriphosphazene), and 4 (the tetramer octachlorotetraphosphazene).

Purification by sublimation gives mainly the trimer and tetramer. Slow vacuum sublimation at approximately 60 °C affords the pure trimer free of the tetramer. Reaction conditions such as temperature may also be tuned to maximise the yield of the trimer at the expense of the other possible products; nonetheless, commercial samples of hexachlorophosphazene usually contain appreciable amounts of octachlorotetraphosphazene, even up to 40%.

Formation mechanism 
Elimination of HCl (the major side product) creates a reactive nucleophilic intermediate

, etc.
until an eventual intramolecular attack leads to the formation of one of the cyclic oligomers.

Reactions

Substitution at P 
Hexachlorophosphazene reacts readily with alkali metal alkoxides and amides.

The nucelophilic polysubstitution of chloride by alkoxide proceeds via displacement of chloride at separate phosphorus centers: 

The observed regioselectivity is due to the combined steric effects and oxygen lone pair π-backdonation (which deactivates already substituted P atoms).

Ring-opening polymerisation 
Heating hexachlorophosphazene to ca. 250 °C induces polymerisation. The tetramer also polymerises in this manner, although more slowly. The conversion is a type of ring-opening polymerisation (ROP). The ROP mechanism is found to be catalysed by Lewis acids, but is overall not very well understood. Prolonged heating of the polymer at higher temperatures (ca. 350 °C) will cause depolymerisation.

The structure of the inorganic chloropolymer product (polydichlorophosphazene) comprises a linear – chain, where n ~ 15000. It was first observed in the late 19th century and its form after chain cross-linking has been called "inorganic rubber" due to its elastomeric behaviour.

This polydichlorophosphazene product is the starting material for a wide class of polymeric compounds, collectively known as polyphosphazenes. Substitution of the chloride groups by other nucleophilic groups, especially alkoxides as laid out above, yields numerous characterised derivatives.

Lewis basicity
The nitrogen centres of hexachlorophosphazene are weakly basic, and this Lewis base behaviour has been suggested to play a role in the polymerisation mechanism.

Among these, the best structurally characterised are the 1:1 adducts with aluminium trichloride or with gallium trichloride; they are found with the Al/Ga atom bound to a N and assume a more prominently distorted chair conformation compared to the free hexachlorophosphazene. The adducts also exhibit fluxional behaviour in solution for temperatures down to −60 °C, which can be monitored with 15N and 31P-NMR.

Coupling reagent 
Hexachlorophosphazene has also found applications in research by enabling aromatic coupling reactions between pyridine and either N,N-dialkylanilines or indole, resulting in 4,4'-substituted phenylpyridine derivatives, postulated to go through a cyclophosphazene pyridinium salt intermediate.

The compound may also be used as a peptide coupling reagent for the synthesis of oligopeptides in chloroform, though for this application the tetramer octachlorotetraphosphazene usually proves more effective.

Photochemical degradation 
Both the trimer and tetramer in hydrocarbon solutions photochemically react forming clear liquids identified as alkyl-substituted derivatives , where n = 3, 4. Such reactions proceed under prolonged UVC (mercury arc) illumination without affecting the  rings. Solid films of the trimer and tetramer will not undergo any chemical change under such irradiation conditions.

Applications

Hexalkoxyphosphazene derivatives 
The hexalkoxyphosphazenes (especially the aryloxy species), resulting from the nucleophilic hexasubstitution of the hexachlorophosphazene P atoms, are valued for their high thermal and chemical stability and their low glass transition temperature. Certain hexalkoxyphosphazenes (such as the hexa-phenoxy derivative) have been put to commercial use as fireproof materials and high temperature lubricants.

Polyphosphazene derivatives 
Polyphosphazenes obtained from polymerised hexachlorophosphazene (polydichlorophosphazene) have gathered attention within the field of inorganic polymers and probed investigations on the properties of elastomeric and thermoplastic derivatives. Some of them appear promising for future applications as fibre- or membrane-forming high performance materials, since they combine transparency, backbone flexibility, tunable hydrophilicity or hydrophobicity, and various other desirable properties.

Current commercial applications for polyphosphazene rubber components are in O-rings, fuel lines and shock absorbers, where the polyphosphazenes confer fire resistance, imperviousness to oils and flexibility even at very low temperatures.

Further reading
Discovery of cyclophosphazenes: Liebig-Wöhler, Briefwechsel vol. 1, 63; Ann. Chem. (Liebig), vol. 11 (1834), 146.
First reports on their polymerisation: H. N. Stokes (1895), On the chloronitrides of phosphorus. American Chemical Journal, vol. 17, p. 275.H. N. Stokes (1896), On Trimetaphosphimic acid and its decomposition products. American Chemical Journal, vol. 18 issue 8, p. 629.
Example of hexalkoxyphosphazene synthesis from hexachlorophosphazene and structure description: 
Novel hexalkoxyphosphazene synthesis not starting from hexachlorophosphazene:

References

Chlorides
Nitrogen heterocycles
Inorganic compounds
Nitrides
Phosphorus heterocycles
Six-membered rings
Phosphazenes